Metering may refer to:

 Measuring instrument: Device for measuring a physical quantity.
 Ramp meter: Device; usually a basic traffic light or a two-section signal (red and green only, no yellow) light together with a signal controller that regulates the flow of traffic.
 Light meter: A way of measuring the amount of light, and typically used to determine the proper exposure for a photograph.
 Metering mode: The way a camera determines the light procured for an exposure
 Water metering

See also
 Software metering